Luis Santeiro is a Cuban-American television screenwriter and playwright born in Havana, Cuba, in 1947.

Biography
Santeiro left the island with his family at the age of twelve for Miami, Florida. He later obtained a degree in sociology from Villanova University.

Santeiro first worked as a television writer for Carrascolendas, a bilingual children's television show that debuted in 1970 on the Austin, Texas, KLRN public television station. In 1976 he became head writer of the bilingual sitcom ¿Qué Pasa, USA?, produced by Miami's public television station WPBT. ¿Qué Pasa, USA? was a half-hour bilingual sitcom set in Miami's Cuban exile community that traced the lives of three generations of Cubans trying to make it in their new homeland. Running for five years, the show received six regional Emmys and nine special awards from the Association of Critics and Commentators on the Arts for its producers, directors, writers, and cast.

Santeiro wrote a total of thirty-three scripts for the show, including the pilot episode. In 1979 he joined the writing team of the children's television program Sesame Street. Santeiro also contributed scripts and song lyrics to other children's programs, such as 3-2-1 Contact, Big Bag, Oye, Willie, and Little Bill. For his writing for children's television programs, Santeiro has been nominated for 20 Daytime Emmy Awards and has won 14, 12 of these during his 29-year career with Sesame Street.

Santeiro is also recognized for his work as a playwright. Among his most notable plays are Our Lady of the Tortilla (1987), The Lady from Havana (1990), and The Rooster and the Egg (1994). For his musical Barrio Babies, Santeiro received the Edward Kleban and Richard Rodgers Award, and in 1995 was honored with the National Hispanic Academy of Media Arts and Sciences Award for his play A Royal Affair. Santeiro has also been recognized for his contributions to Latino arts and culture with honors such as the Hispanic Achievement Award (1991) and the Hispanic Heritage Award (1993).

He picked up the Leone in Memoriam award given to Tomas Milian at the 7º Almería Western Film Festival on October 11, 2017.

Works or publications

Notes and references

External links

 
 The Luis Santeiro papers are available at the Cuban Heritage Collection, University of Miami Libraries. This archival collection includes television scripts for the bilingual sitcom ¿Qué Pasa, USA? and other files related to the show, such as contracts and reviews. The papers also consist of scripts and other documents related to his plays (such as programs and production files) and documents regarding Carrascolendas.
 Creator page for Luis Santeiro in the Cuban Theater Digital Archive.

Hispanic and Latino American dramatists and playwrights
Cuban exiles
Cuban dramatists and playwrights
Cuban male writers
American male dramatists and playwrights
American dramatists and playwrights
Living people
1947 births